His Honour Gerald Norman Butler, QC (15 September 1930 – 28 February 2010) was an English judge, who was the senior judge at Southwark Crown Court. He was born in Hackney, London.

Family
Butler was the son of Joshua Butler and Esther, née Lampel.

Education

Butler attended Ilford County High School before reading Law at London School of Economics, graduating with an LLB in 1952. Following this, he was awarded a BCL from Magdalen College, Oxford in 1954.

Career

Butler was called to the bar in the Middle Temple, 1955.  His career was interrupted by National Service; he was a 2nd lieutenant in the Royal Army Service Corps, 1956–57.  He became a QC in 1975.  He was a Recorder of the Crown Court, 1977–82, a Circuit Judge, 1982–97, and senior judge at Southwark Crown Court, 1984–97.

After his retirement, he was invited to conduct inquiries and produce reports into:

 the English Rugby Football Union, 1997
 Central Casework at the Crown Prosecution Service, 1999
 prosecution of Regina v Doran and others, 2000
 Treasury Counsel instructed by the Crown Prosecution Service, 2000
 The 1981 New Cross fire that killed 13 black youngsters, 2004

Controversy

In August 2005, he made controversial remarks that human rights laws stood in the way of attempts to crack down on terrorists, because after the terrorist attacks on London in July, Britain was no longer in a "normal" state where human rights legislation was always beneficial.

Sporting activities

He was a member of the Marylebone Cricket Club.

See also
List of British Jews

References

General
 Who's Who 2008
 Gerald Butler's obituary  The Times
 Telegraph obituary

1930 births
2010 deaths
British King's Counsel
20th-century English judges
People from Hackney Central
20th-century King's Counsel
People educated at Ilford County High School
Royal Army Service Corps officers
Alumni of the London School of Economics
Alumni of Magdalen College, Oxford
English Jews
20th-century British Army personnel